In the U.S. state of Alaska, Outside refers to any non-Alaska location, most often referring to other U.S. states. The term has been in use since at least the beginning of the 20th century and is believed to be an adaptation of a similar Canadian term used in the northern portion of that country and referring to southern Canada. The expression is typically used in an adverbial phrase following some form of the word "go", but it is also used as a simple noun.  Examples would include,
 "Bob and Francis took their children on vacation Outside last year; they visited relatives in the Midwest and the Deep South."
 "When I met Ronald, he was the first white person I'd met who was fluent in Yupik, so it came as a big surprise to learn that he was actually born Outside."

An early usage of the term is in Through the Yukon Gold Diggings, by Josiah Spurr, published in Boston in 1900. Usage continues today, particularly in publications away from Southcentral Alaska and Anchorage. The inverse of the term ("Inside") is infrequently used.

See also 

Lower 48

References 
 

Alaska culture
American English words
Localism (politics)